Nesam is a 1997 Indian Tamil-language romantic comedy film written and directed by K. Subash. The film stars Ajith Kumar and Maheswari, while Goundamani, Senthil and Manivannan among others play other pivotal roles. The film, which has music composed by Deva, released on 15 January 1997 to mixed reviews and became a commercial failure. The film was dubbed and released in Telugu as Prema Janta.

Cast

Release
The film opened to mixed reviews. Two years after release, the producers were given a 5 lakh subsidy by Tamil Nadu Chief Minister M. Karunanidhi along with ten other films.

Soundtrack
Music was composed by Deva.

References

1997 films
Films scored by Deva (composer)
1990s Tamil-language films
Indian romantic comedy films
Films directed by K. Subash
1997 romantic comedy films